Secret Rendez-Vous is the second album by Cindy Valentine and a single by the same name, both records were distributed on vinyl and cassette tape. Secret Rendez-Vous was Valentine's second album, working with composer and producer Tony Green, the pair composed all of the music. "Secret Rendez-Vous" peaked at #43 on Billboard Magazine's, Hot Dance Club Songs chart.

Personnel

Vocalists 
 Cindy Valentine (featured artist)

Backing Vocals 

 Vivian Cherry
 Dennis Collins
 Diva Gray
 Milt Grayson
 Hilda Harris
 Howard Hewett
 David Lasley
 Cheryl Lynn
 Deborah McDuffie
 Angela Clemmons Patrick
 Myrna Smith Schicung
 Fonzie Thornton
 Joey Ward
 Luther Vandross

Musicians 

 Michael Brecker – saxophone
 Tony Bridges – electric bass, synth 
 David Edmead – keyboards, synth, drum programming 
 Tony Green – keyboards 
 Bashiri Johnson – percussion
 Martin Klein – drum programming
 Paul Pesco – guitar
 Doc Powell – guitar
 Tony Prendatt – keyboards, synth, drum programming
 Craig Snyder – guitar
 Roger Squitero – percussion
 Ed Terry – keyboards, synth, drum programming
 Jeff Vilinsky – keyboards, drum programming

Production 

 Mark Berry – producer (tracks: A1)
 Carol Cafiero – asst. engineer
 Brian Davis – photography
 Jerome Gasper – executive production, mastering
 Tony Green – production, musical arrangement, written by (tracks: All),  mixing
 Roger Guerin – engineering
 Don Hahn – engineering
 Sylvain Jacob – engineering
 Matthew "Krash" Kasha – mixing, engineering
 Bill Levy – art direction
 Lenny Manchess – engineering
 Deborah McDuffie – background vocal arrangement
 Jay Pollock – asst. engineer
 Tony Prendatt – producer (arrangement), mixing
 Jose Rodriguez – mastering
 Ed Terry – engineering
 Cindy Valentine – written by (tracks: All)
 Tom Vercillo – asst. engineer
 Jeff Vilinsky – musical arrangement (tracks: A5, B2),

Track listing

LP album

Singles

Secret Rendez-vous

In Your Midnight Hour

References

External links 
 Valentine Productions
 

1987 albums
1987 singles
Cindy Valentine albums
Albums produced by Tony Green
Polydor Records albums
Polydor Records singles